The red-crested turaco (Tauraco erythrolophus) is a turaco, a group of African Otidimorphae birds. It is a frugivorous bird endemic to western Angola. Its call sounds somewhat like a jungle monkey.

Description 
The red-crested turaco weighs 210-325 g and is 45-50 cm long. It looks similar to the Bannerman's turaco, but differs in crest and face colors. Both sexes are similar.

Behaviour 
They are seen in flocks of up to 30 birds, or in pairs. They usually remain in trees, only coming down to eat or drink.

Voice 
A deep barking call. the female's call is slightly higher-pitched than the male's. They are highly vocal, particularly at dawn.

Reproduction 
Red-crested turacos are monogamous. Both mates build a flimsy nest 5 to 20 meters above the ground in dense foliage. After laying eggs, both birds incubate the eggs. The young leave the nest at 4-5 weeks old.

As a national bird
The red-crested turaco is the national bird of Angola. It occurs quite commonly along the length of the Angolan escarpment and adjacent forested habitats.

Gallery

References

red-crested turaco
Endemic birds of Angola
red-crested turaco
red-crested turaco